Theretra clotho, the common hunter hawkmoth, is a moth of the family Sphingidae. It is found from Sri Lanka, India (including the Andaman Islands), Nepal and Myanmar, east through China to Taiwan, South Korea and Japan, and then south-east through South East Asia as far as the Lesser Sunda Islands and Timor in Indonesia. An uncommon migrant may be found up to northern China (this range includes Theretra celata, which is sometimes treated as a valid species). The habitat consists of open forests, forest edges, orchards, plantations, wooded scrubs, suburban gardens and city parks.

Description 
The wingspan is 70–100 mm. The head and thorax are greenish brown, with a white lateral stripe running from the palpus to the rear of the thorax. The abdomen is also greenish brown, with a black lateral patch near the thorax. The forewings are greyish brown with a sharp brown oblique band running from the inner margin to the apex and a fine black discal spot. The hindwings are black basally and brown distally, with a buff patch at the anal angle. The antennae and legs are white.

Biology 
In Hong Kong, adults are on wing in multiple generations per year, with records from April to late October (peaks in mid-April, late May, mid-August and mid-October). In Korea, adults are on wing in August. In general though, adults are on wing from April or May to October throughout the southern range.

Larvae have been recorded feeding on Amorphophallus, Hibiscus, Parthenocissus, Saurauia and Vitis in Guangdong and Hong Kong. Other hosts include Cissus species, as well as Ampelopsis glandulosa in Japan and on Cissus hastata in Singapore. Elsewhere, other major host plant families include Actinidiaceae, Araceae, Begoniaceae and Dilleniaceae.

Subspecies
Theretra clotho clotho
Theretra clotho vincenti Vaglia & Liyous, 2010 (Philippines)
Theretra clotho celata (Butler, 1877) (Moluccas east to Vanuatu and south to Australia)

Gallery

References

Theretra
Moths described in 1773
Taxa named by Dru Drury
Moths of Japan